A letter board may refer to two devices.

Types of letter boards

Marquee 

A letter board or letter sign, also known as marquee, is a customizable form of signage that employs individually movable letters of the alphabet. They are used by, e.g., movie theaters to list the current roster of films, churches to display the titles of sermons, and other buildings, people, and institutions whose signs are required to change on a regular basis.

Communication Board 

A letter board, or communication board, refers to a device used to supplement verbal communication. Communication boards can be as basic as letters of the alphabet or contain extensive options of words, phrases, pictures, and symbols of common items or actions. These boards are multimodal and may be digital or analog. Individuals with speech and language impairments or non-verbal communicators may use communication boards depending on their degree of gross motor skills.

Augmentative and alternative communication (AAC) aids are utilized by individuals who experience congenital disabilities, such as autism spectrum disorder, cerebral palsy, developmental disabilities, intellectual disabilities, developmental apraxia of speech and genetic disorders, and acquired disabilities, including amyotrophic lateral sclerosis, cerebrovascular disease, glossectomy, laryngectomy, primary progressive aphasia, supranuclear palsy, and traumatic brain injuries.

Forms of Communication Aid 
AAC can be divided into different categories, but are most commonly categorized as unaided or aided. These forms of communication can also be analog or digital.

Unaided 
Unaided forms of augmented communication do not require any external tools or aid to communicate. This form of AAC requires fine motor skills. When a person uses unaided AAC they are relying solely on their body to communicate. These are non-technological forms of expression, such as facial expressions, body language, and facial gestures. Sign language is the primary example of unaided AAC.

Aided 
Aided forms of augmented communication require some external tools or aid in order to communicate, either analog or digital.

Digital Communication Aid 
Digital or high-tech communication devices come in a variety of forms. With the rise of technology, more applications are being produced to assist individuals in need of AAC. Speech generating devices (SGD) are among the most popular variation of high-tech communication devices. AAC and SGD software allow different forms of synthesized and digitized speech to be used through voice or message banking. Such applications are available on smartphones, tablets, and computers.

Other high-tech AAC works as a grid of buttons that can be utilized by gazing or controlled by a mouse that has pre-recorded messages installed to supplement spoken word.

Analog Communication Aid 
Analog or low-tech communication devices are common among children with autism spectrum disorder who are non-verbal. These communication aids can be as simple as a yes/no board or a laminated piece of paper with the alphabet or pictures. Most boards are used by pointing, gesturing, or gazing at the intended symbol, word or phrase. Some require the person to spell out words. Other forms include books, photographs, writing and objects.

Notes

Signage